Cian Ferriter is an Irish lawyer who has been a judge of the High Court since October 2021. He practised as a barrister specialising in commercial and media law.

Early life 
Ferriter attended secondary school at St Benildus College in Kilmacud until 1986. He studied at University College Dublin, graduating with a BCL degree in 1993 and an arbitration diploma in 2000. He was the auditor of the University College Dublin Law Society between 1991 and 1992 and was the individual winner of the Irish Times Debate in 1992.

His brother is the professor of history Diarmaid Ferriter.

He was the moderator of the second series of the television programme The Blackbird And The Bell on RTÉ One.

Legal career 
He became a member of the Irish bar in 1998 and a senior counsel in 2011. He has been involved in cases involving injunctions, insolvency law, tax law, company law, procurement law and intellectual property law. Among parties he represented were the estate of James Joyce, the Criminal Assets Bureau, Brian Curtin, Dublin Airport Authority, Anglo Irish Bank, the National Asset Management Agency and  Google.

He has acted for financial institutions in debt enforcement cases, including the Bank of Ireland in enforcement actions against Brian O'Donnell and Everyday Finance against Ivor Callely. He was counsel for John Gilligan in a 2003 appeal to a conviction for possession of drugs for supply and for Thomas Murphy in 2007 in a challenge against the Criminal Asset Bureau. He was appointed to represent the Garda Commissioner at the Barr Tribunal and represented the Mahon Tribunal in a High Court action taken by Bertie Ahern. He was counsel for Tomasz Zalewski in the Supreme Court of Ireland who successfully challenged the constitutionality of aspects of the Workplace Relations Commission.

Ferriter frequently appeared in defamation cases, acting for RTÉ in actions taken by the politicians Beverley Flynn and Joe Costello, for Independent News & Media against Monica Leech and for The Irish Times against Maurice McCabe.

The Central Bank of Ireland appointed him chairperson of the Irish Takeover Panel in June 2018. In 2019, he became a board member of the Irish Traditional Music Archive and Poetry Ireland.

Judicial career 
Ferriter was nominated to the High Court in September 2021. He was appointed on 5 October 2021.

He has presided over cases involving refugee law, judicial review, personal insolvency, medical negligence and personal injuries.

Personal life 
He lives in Dublin and writes poetry. He was the winner of the 2019 Westival International Poetry Competition and runner up of the 2020 Gregory O’Donoghue International Poetry Competition.

References

Living people
High Court judges (Ireland)
Alumni of University College Dublin
Alumni of King's Inns
Year of birth missing (living people)
21st-century Irish poets
RTÉ television presenters
Irish barristers